Cătălin Florin Hlistei (born 24 August 1994) is a Romanian professional footballer who plays as a midfielder for Politehnica Iași.

Honours
Rapid București
Liga III: 2018–19

References

External links
 
 

1994 births
Living people
Sportspeople from Arad, Romania
Romanian footballers
Association football midfielders
Liga I players
CS Pandurii Târgu Jiu players
FC Universitatea Cluj players
Liga II players
FC UTA Arad players
CS Sportul Snagov players
FC Rapid București players
FC Politehnica Iași (2010) players